Binh Phuoc Football Club, simply known as Binh Phuoc, is a professional football club, based in Đồng Xoài, Bình Phước, Vietnam, that plays in the V.League 2, the second tier of Vietnamese football.

Current squad 
As of 3 June 2021.

Notable players
  Victor Kamhuka
  Zakaria Suraka
  To Van Vu
  Dawda Ceesay

Managers
  Lê Trung Hậu (2013–14)
  Lê Thanh Xuân (2015–2019)
  Nguyễn Minh Phương (2019–2020)
  Võ Quốc Huy (2020)
  Văn Sỹ Sơn (2021)
  Phan Công Lộc (2021)
   Le Thanh Xuan (2022-)

Honours

National competitions
V.League 2:
 Third place : 2017, 2019

References

External links
 

Bình Phước F.C.